Matthew Ray Shultz (born October 23, 1983) is an American singer, songwriter, and musician best known as the lead singer and occasional guitarist for the American rock band Cage the Elephant.

Early life
Matthew Ray Shultz was born on October 23, 1983 and raised in Bowling Green, Kentucky, alongside high school friends and future bandmates including his older brother Brad Shultz (guitar), Daniel Tichenor (bass, backing vocals), Lincoln Parish (lead guitar), and Jared Champion (drums). Shultz and his brother came from a poor background and were sometimes teased for this, with his brother being called "Poor Boy" by children at their school. Their father is also a musician and also named Brad. Their parents separated when the brothers were young. After the divorce, their mother dated Shultz's football coach, prompting him to quit the team and play music as an act of rebellion.

Before starting Cage the Elephant, Shultz worked in construction as a plumber. He said in an interview that he felt if he didn't quit that job, he would be stuck there for the rest of his life. He therefore quit and worked at a sandwich bar with Brad, who had previously worked in telemarketing.

Personal life

Matt Shultz married Eva Ross in early February 2020. Eva Ross is an actress, dancer and musician. They met in Kentucky where they are both from. "Love's The Only Way" was a song written by Matt for Eva while they were dating. Eva announced on December 1, 2021 that the couple had separated and were filing for divorce. Shultz was previously married to Juliette Buchs from 2014 to 2018.

On January 5, 2023, Shultz was arrested in New York on charges of felony firearm possession. Shultz was staying at The Bowery Hotel in Manhattan, where a hotel employee reportedly saw him carrying a firearm into the bathroom and called 9-1-1.

Musical influences
Shultz cites bands such as the Pixies as influential on his vocal style, explaining that he discovered them alongside other punk bands while living in England during the recording of Thank You, Happy Birthday. His stage persona is inspired by punk pioneers such as Iggy Pop.

Art 
Matt Shultz began his art career as the lead singer and a founding member of Cage The Elephant. While continuing his musical career, Shultz has gone on to explore a vast array of artistic mediums, including dance, fashion design, visual art, and performance art.

In March 2019, Shultz released a Boot Collection with The Frye Company.

In August 2019, Shultz threw his debut art show in Greenpoint, Brooklyn with New York artist Danny Cole, Beck, and other friends. The event was captured by Rolling Stone in a photo journal.

Accomplishments 
Cage the Elephant's first nomination came in 2011, when the music video for "Shake Me Down" was nominated for the Best Rock Video at the 2011 MTV Video Music Awards. In 2014, Cage the Elephant was nominated for the Best Alternative Music Album for Melophobia, at the 57th Annual Grammy Awards. In 2016, Cage the Elephant won the Grammy Award for Best Rock Album for Tell Me I'm Pretty, winning again in 2019 for Social Cues.

References

External links

 http://www.cagetheelephant.com/biox/?pagename=Bio

1983 births
21st-century American singers
21st-century American male singers
American expatriates in the United Kingdom
American rock singers
Cage the Elephant members
Grammy Award winners
Living people
Musicians from Bowling Green, Kentucky
Rock musicians from Kentucky
Singers from Kentucky